Amy Palant is an American voice actress and singer. Her most famous role was Miles "Tails" Prower of Sonic X and the video games of the franchise from 2005 to 2010.

Career
Palant studied voice acting at Edge Studio, under founder David Goldberg. She worked with the studio as a performer and voice coach up until the early-2010's. She has also worked with 4Kids Entertainment (2003-2012), Central Park Media and DuArt Film and Video.

As a singer, Palant has performed with numerous bands, and was a founding member of the New York-based Alternate Folk band Bombshell, now known as The Shells, formed in 2005. She left the band in 2006.

Filmography

Animation 
 Becca's Bunch – Mayor Ladymaus
 Fighting Foodons – Kayla
 Magical DoReMi – Dorie Goodwyn/ David (Ep.11)
 Mew Mew Power – Cassandra
 Midori Days – Makie, Marin, Yuma Takiguchi
 One Piece – Miss Valentine
 Pokémon - Various Characters 
 Shaman King – Millie of The Lily Five
 Shura no Toki – Princess Yuki
 Sonic X – Miles "Tails" Prower
 Tai Chi Chasers – Terra

Video games 
 Sonic the Hedgehog (series) – Miles "Tails" Prower (2005-2010)
 Mario & Sonic at the Olympic Games (series)
 Beijing 2008
 Vancouver 2010
 Other SEGA games
 All-Stars Racing
 Superstars Tennis
 Shadow the Hedgehog
 Sonic Storybooks (series)
 Black Knight – Tails / Blacksmith
 Secret Rings – Tails / Ali Baba
 Sonic Riders (series)
 Riders 1
 Zero Gravity
 Sonic Rivals (series)
 Rivals 1
 Rivals 2
 Sonic Rush (series)
 Rush 1
 Rush Adventure
 Sonic the Hedgehog – Tails, Anna
 Unleashed

References

External links
 
 

Living people
American video game actresses
American voice actresses
Year of birth missing (living people)
21st-century American women